The 2022 Arizona Secretary of State election took place on November 8, 2022, to elect the next secretary of state of Arizona. Incumbent Democratic Secretary of State Katie Hobbs declined to run for a second term to instead run for governor. Primary elections were held on August 2, 2022. Democrat and former Maricopa County recorder Adrian Fontes defeated Republican representative Mark Finchem by 4.8%.

Finchem was backed by the America First Secretary of State Coalition, a Republican group supporting Secretary of State candidates who championed the far-right conspiracy theory that falsely claimed that Donald Trump won the 2020 United States presidential election. Due to a combination of Arizona's role as a swing state in the previous presidential election, Finchem's views, and the role of the Secretary of State in certifying elections, the race took upon an uncharacteristically high national profile.

Democratic primary

Candidates

Nominee 
 Adrian Fontes, former Maricopa County Recorder (2017–2020) and U.S. Marine Corps veteran

Eliminated in primary 
 Reginald Bolding, minority leader of the Arizona House of Representatives

Declined 
 Katie Hobbs, incumbent Secretary of State (ran for Governor)

Polling

Results

Republican primary

Candidates

Nominee 
 Mark Finchem, state representative for Arizona's 11th legislative district

Eliminated in primary 
 Shawnna Bolick, state representative for Arizona's 20th legislative district
 Beau Lane, advertising executive
 Michelle Ugenti-Rita, state senator for Arizona's 23rd legislative district

Endorsements

Polling

Results

General election

Debate 
A debate was held on September 22.

Predictions

Endorsements

Polling 
Graphical summary

Katie Hobbs vs. Michelle Ugenti-Rita

Generic Democrat vs. generic Republican

Results

Post-election legal challenge 

In December 2022, Mark Finchem filed a lawsuit petitioning for the election to be "nullified and redone"; the lawsuit was dismissed with prejudice that month by Maricopa County Superior Court Judge Melissa Julian, confirming Adrian Fontes' victory in the election. While Finchem alleged that voting machines in Arizona were not properly certified, the judge rejected this, because the Election Assistance Commission did not vote to revoke certification, which is the procedure under federal law, so the judge rejected the merits of Finchem's arguments on voting machines certification. The judge also rejected the merits of Finchem's arguments on voting software certification. Next, regarding Finchem's issues with tabulating machines and a website listing for an estimated number of votes, the judge concluded that Finchem "does not allege that any of the votes cast were actually illegal" and does not allege that any legal vote was not counted, but only alleged "suspicions that some votes may not have been counted", so the judge rejected this argument as insufficient to overturn an election. 

Then, the judge rejected Finchem's allegations of "misconduct" by Secretary of State Katie Hobbs as insufficient. Finchem argued that Hobbs should have recused after her gubernatorial opponent Kari Lake "perceived a conflict of interest", with the judge responding that this were "not well-pled facts; they are legal conclusions masquerading as alleged facts", and legal conclusions unsupported by Arizona law. Regarding Hobbs' actions in telling Mohave County and Cochise County to certify their election by the November 28 deadline, the judge stated that it was Hobbs' responsibility "to ensure the canvass and certification of a general election is completed within the statutorily prescribed timeframes", and that it was not misconduct for her "to communicate with other governing bodies to ensure" thus. Finally, the judge rejected Finchem's protest over his allegation that Twitter suspended his account in October 2022 as irrelevant because Twitter is not an "election official".

Notes 

Partisan clients

References

External links 
Official campaign websites
 Mark Finchem (R) for Secretary of State
 Adrian Fontes (D) for Secretary of State

Secretary of State
Arizona
Arizona Secretary of State elections